Seyar or Sir may refer to:
 Seyar-e Olya (disambiguation)
 Seyar-e Sofla (disambiguation)
 Seyar-e Vosta